Baardseth is a Norwegian surname. Notable people with the surname include:

Egil Baardseth (1912–1991), Norwegian botanist and phycologist, nephew of Torger
Torger Baardseth (1875–1947), Norwegian bookseller and publisher

Norwegian-language surnames